Sabine Pass Independent School District is a public school district in Sabine Pass, a community in Port Arthur, Texas (USA). The school serves sections of Port Arthur and unincorporated Jefferson County.

The district has one school that serves students in grades early childhood through twelve.
As of 2020, the graduating class sizes have all been between 30 and 40.

In 2019, the school district received an "A" overall performance grade by the Texas Education Agency.

References

External links

Sabine Pass ISD

School districts in Jefferson County, Texas
Port Arthur, Texas